This is a list of topics related to the African diaspora.

Overview
 Black people
 African diaspora

Black diasporans by region

Americas

North America
 Afro-Guatemalan
 Afro-Honduran
 Belizean Kriol people
 Cimarron people
 Black ladinos
 African American
 African immigrants
 Afro-American peoples of the Americas
 Afro-Mexican
 Atlantic Creole
 Bahamian American
 Barbadian American
 Black Canadians
 Black Indians in the United States
 Black Nova Scotians
 Black Seminoles
 Dominickers
 Gullah
 Haitian Americans
 Haitian Canadian
 Jamaican American
 Jamaican Canadian
 Louisiana Creole people
 Nigerian American
 Trinidadian American
 Trinidadian Canadian
 Melungeon
 Afro-Panamanians
 Afro-Nicaraguans
 Afro–Costa Ricans
 Afro-Salvadorans

South America

 Afro Argentine
 Afro-Brazilian
 Afro Bolivian
 Afro-Colombian
 Afro-Ecuadorian people
 Afro-Guyanese
 Afro-Peruvian
 Garifuna people
 Palenquero
 Pardo
 Afro-Venezuelans
 Afro-Chileans
 Afro-Uruguayans
 Afro-Surinamese people

Caribbean (West Indies)

 Afro-Antiguan and Barbudan
 Afro-Bahamian
 Afro-Barbadian
 Afro-Caribbean leftism
 Afro-Caribbean
Afro-Caribbean music 
 Afro-Cuban
 Afro-Dominican (Dominica)
 Afro-Dominican (Dominican Republic)
 Afro-Puerto Rican
 Afro-Saint Lucian
 Afro-Trinidadian and Tobagonian
 Afro-Vincentian
 Barbados
 Bahamas
 Dominica
 Dominican Republic
 Haiti
 Jamaicans of African ancestry
 Maroons
 Papiamento
 Puerto Rico

Asia
 Africans in Guangzhou
 Afro-Asian
 Lashar
 Siddi
 Africans in Malaysia
 Black people in Japan
 Afro-Iranians

Europe
 Italians of African descent
 Afro-Greeks
 Afro-French
 Afro-Germans
 Portuguese of Black African ancestry
 Black British
 Africans in Europe
 Black people in Ireland
 British African-Caribbean community
 Afro-Romanians
 Afro-Spaniards
 Afro-Russians
 Afro-Ukrainians
 Black Belgians
 Afro-Norwegian
 Africans in Finland
 Afro-Turks
 African immigrants to Switzerland
 African immigrants to Sweden

History
 Pre-Columbian Africa-Americas contact theories
 African American history
 COINTELPRO
 Indian Ocean slave trade
Trans-Saharan slave trade
 Atlantic slave trade
 Barbados Slave Code
 Brown v. Board of Education
 Christianity and slavery
 George Floyd protests
 History of slavery
 Los Angeles riots of 1992
 Mass racial violence in the United States
 Plantation economy
 Plessy v. Ferguson
 Quilombo Dos Palmares
 Racial segregation in the United States
 Racism in the United States
 Rodney King
 Rosewood massacre
 Slavery in Brazil
 Slavery in Canada
 Slavery in the British and French Caribbean
 Slavery in the British Virgin Islands
 Slavery in the Spanish New World colonies
 Slavery in the United States
 Sugar plantations in the Caribbean
 Triangular trade
 Tulsa race riot
 Watts Riots

Political and social movements

United States
 Abolitionism
 Abolitionism in the United Kingdom 
 Abolitionism in the United States
 Affirmative action
 African American leftism
 African Americans in the United States Congress
 Timeline of the civil rights movement
 Civil rights movement (1896–1954)
 Civil rights movement
 American Anti-Slavery Society
 Black Guerrilla Family
 Black Hebrew Israelites
 Black Liberation Army
 Black Liberators
 Black Lives Matter
 Islam in the African diaspora
 Black Panther Party
 Civil rights movement in Omaha, Nebraska
 Congressional Black Caucus
 Five Percenters
 "Great Migrations":
 The original Great Migration, 1910–1930
 The Second Great Migration, 1941–1970
 The New Great Migration, 1980–present
 Historical Black Press Foundation
 National Association for the Advancement of Colored People
 Nation of Islam
 Police brutality
 Rainbow/PUSH
 Pennsylvania Abolition Society
 Southern Christian Leadership Conference (SCLC)
 The Communist Party and African-Americans
 League of Revolutionary Black Workers
 Underground Railroad
 100 Black Men of America

Caribbean
 African Caribbean leftism
 Raizal
 Rastafari movement

Other movements 
 Back-to-Africa movement
 Black anarchism
 Black leftism
 Black nationalism
 Black populism
 Black Power
 Black pride
 Black separatism
 Black supremacy
 Black theology
 Historically black colleges and universities
 Neo Black Movement of Africa
 One-drop rule
 The 1990 Trust
 United Negro College Fund

Culture 
 African American art
 African American culture
 African American history
 African American music
 Africanisms
 Afro
 Afro-American religion
 Afro-textured hair
 Black people
 Black church
 Black rage (law)
 Capoeira
 Dreadlocks
 Stereotypes of African Americans
 African characters in comics
 List of black animated characters
 List of black video game characters

Cinema and theater 
 Blackface
 Blaxploitation
 L.A. Rebellion
 List of films about Black girlhood
 Race film
Film festivals
 American Black Film Festival, Los Angeles
 Hollywood Black Film Festival, Los Angeles

Music 
 African American music
 Afro-Caribbean music
 Bachata
 Baila
 Black British music
 Bouyon
 Capoeira music
 Compas
 Gaita
 Gospel music
 Negro Spirituals
 Gwo ka
 Hip hop
 Miami bass
 List of hip hop genres
 Jazz
 Bebop
 Blues
 Bossa nova
 Latin jazz
 Salsa
 Zydeco
 Liwa
 Music of the African diaspora
 Reggae
 Calypso
 Chutney Soca
 Dancehall
 Extempo
 Ragga
 Reggaeton
 Ska
 Soca
 Spouge
 Rock and roll
 Rumba
 Rhythm and blues
 Contemporary R&B
 Funk
 Neo soul
 New jack swing
 Soul music
 Samba
 Zouk

Sports
 Bajan stick licking
 Black players in American professional football
 Brazilian Jiu-Jitsu
 Esporte Clube Bahia
 History of African Americans in the Canadian Football League
 List of black college football classics
 Negro league baseball

Science and mathematics
 List of African-American mathematicians
 Mathematicians of the African Diaspora
 List of African American inventors and scientists

Other related terms
 African admixture in Europe
 African American Vernacular English
 Africoid peoples
 Amos 'n' Andy
 Black billionaires
 Black people
 Capoid race
 Colored
 Creole peoples
 Ebonics
 Golliwogg
 Lawn jockey
 Maroons
 Minstrel show
 Mulatto
 Multiracial
 Nation language
 Negrescence
 Negrito
 Négritude
 Negro
 Negro Mountain
 Negroid
 Passing
 Redbone (ethnicity)
 Stepin Fetchit
 Zanj
 Zanj Rebellion

See also 
 List of Afro-Latinos
 List of African-American firsts
 List of black Academy Award winners and nominees
 List of black animated characters
 List of black superheroes
 Black billionaires
 List of historically black colleges and universities
 Index of African-American-related articles
 List of African American Greek and fraternal organizations
 List of topics related to Africa
 The Young Friends Society of African Diasporan Institutions

References

Black people
African Diaspora